History of politics may refer to:
Political history
History of political thought

See also
Political history of the world